Kotjebi, kotchebi, or ggotjebi is a Korean term denoting North Korean homeless people. The term was originally used to describe homeless children. The term literally means "flowering swallows (꽃 제비)", given because of the kotjebi's constant search for food and shelter. The kotjebi are not officially recognized in North Korea, with any mention of the term being prohibited in state publications and documents.

Origins and status 

The orphaned kotjebi first appeared en masse in the mid-1990s in the wake of the North Korean famine, which collapsed the food distribution system.  In an effort to "stabilize the livelihood of vagrants throughout the country", the North Korean government established special "Children's Detention Camps" in 1995, which were effectively rundown apartments. Because of poor conditions in the detention camps, children have died of malnutrition. Elderly people are known as noin kotjebi.

Livelihood 
The kotjebi are constantly forced to seek food and thus gather in groups to beg and pickpocket. Most of the kotjebi eat only once a day. The diet of the kotjebi, along with the food they obtain from begging, consists mainly of grass soup, wild vegetable porridge, and grass roots.

See also 
Human rights in North Korea
Street child
Orphans in the Soviet Union

References 

Homelessness
Society of North Korea

Street children